The 1970 Motor Trend 500 was a NASCAR Grand National Series event that was held on January 18, 1970, at Riverside International Raceway in Riverside, California.

Race report
The Plymouth Superbird would make its first NASCAR appearance during this race. Six cautions slowed the race for 31  laps. A. J. Foyt was the winner in his 1970 Ford Torino; defeating Roger McCluskey by 3½ seconds. Parnelli Jones won the pole position but had to start far down in the field because NASCAR ruled that the Firestone tires that Jones and nine West Coast drivers used in qualifying were "ineligible" as there were not enough of that particular compound available to other racers. Other drivers affected by this ruling included Ray Elder, who had qualified 9th; Jack McCoy, who qualified 13th; 1969 NASCAR PCLM champion Scotty Cain, and Dick Bown. After switching tires, the ten drivers were allowed to start behind other qualifiers in order of their qualifying speed. After nearly pulling out of the race in dispute, Jones started in 35th position and charged through the field. He gained 18 positions on the first lap. He took the lead on lap 80 and almost lapped the entire field until his clutch broke on lap 160; giving him an 11th-place finish. Out of A.J. Foyt's seven Cup wins this was his only one that came on a road course. All of his other victories were on super speedways.

USAC Stock Car champion McCluskey crossed over for his only NASCAR race of the 1970 season and raced his Superbird complete with popular Looney Tunes character the Road Runner painted on the door, and finished second. This was his only NASCAR top-five finish.

There were forty-four competitors in this race; 43 were from the United States of America while (Lothar Motschenbacher) was from Cologne, West Germany. Veteran West Coast racer Jim Cook suffered a career ending accident, when his car collided with the end of the turn 9 crashwall on lap 94. His injuries would leave him in a wheelchair. The other finishers in the top ten were: LeeRoy Yarbrough, Donnie Allison, Richard Petty, Dan Gurney (who had become a mainstay at the track during the 1960s  and would leave NASCAR after this year), Neil Castles, Friday Hassler, Jerry Oliver, and Dick Guldstrand. Motschenbacher would start in 31st place and finish the race in 40th. Sam Posey's lone NASCAR start ended spectacularly when the #6 Dodge's engine failed and caused a fire.

There were 43,200 fans to see 193 laps of action on the road course. This was the last start in NASCAR's top series (then known as Grand National) for Southern California short track racer Frank Deiny. He would finish in 41st place due to wheel bearing issues on lap 4. However, this event included yellow flags. Famous crew chiefs participating in this race included Banjo Matthews, Dale Inman, Jerry Hyde and Dick Hutcherson.

The winner's purse was $19,700 ($ when adjusted for inflation) while the last-place finisher went home with $800 ($ when adjusted for inflation). The total amount of money offered was $84,235 ($ when adjusted for inflation).

Qualifying

Finishing order
Section reference:

 A.J. Foyt
 Roger McCluskey
 LeeRoy Yarbrough
 Donnie Allison
 Richard Petty
 Dan Gurney
 Neil Castles
 Friday Hassler
 Jerry Oliver
 Dick Guldstrand
 Parnelli Jones
 Kevin Terris
 Bobby Allison
 Dave Marcis
 Sam Rose
 Dave Alonzo
 David Pearson
 Dick Kranzler
 Paul Dorrity
 Joe Frasson
 Frank James
 Dick Bown
 Randy Dodd
 Ray Elder
 Jimmy Insolo
 Jim Cook
 Steve Froines
 Sam Posey
 Bobby Isaac
 Jack McCoy
 G.T. Dallas
 Les Loeser, Jr.
 Dick Brooks
 Buddy Young
 James Hylton
 Elmo Langley
 Carl Joiner, Jr.
 Don Noel
 Don White
 Lothar Motschenbacher
 Frank Deiny
 Scotty Cain
 Bob England
 Frank Warren

Timeline
Section reference:
 Start: David Pearson's vehicle was the first to leave the start/finish line as the green flag was waved in the air.
 Lap 26: A.J. Foyt took over the lead from David Pearson.
 Lap 27: Richard Petty took over the lead from A.J. Foyt.
 Lap 29: David Pearson took over the lead from Richard Petty.
 Lap 35: LeeRoy Yarbrough took over the lead from David Pearson.
 Lap 36: A.J. Foyt took over the lead from LeeRoy Yarbrough.
 Lap 43: Parnelli Jones took over the lead from A.J. Foyt.
 Lap 44: LeeRoy Yarbrough took over the lead from Parnelli Jones.
 Lap 45: Donnie Allison took over the lead from LeeRoy Yarbrough.
 Lap 65: A.J. Foyt took over the lead from Donnie Allison.
 Lap 67: Parnelli Jones took over the lead from A.J. Foyt.
 Lap 85: Donnie Allison took over the lead from Parnelli Jones.
 Lap 87: David Pearson took over the lead from Donnie Allison.
 Lap 95: LeeRoy Yarbrough took over the leaf from David Pearson.
 Lap 96: Roger McCluskey took over the lead from LeeRoy Yarbrough.
 Lap 98: LeeRoy Yarbrough took over the lead from Roger McCluskey.
 Lap 99: Parnelli Jones took over the lead from LeeRoy Yarbrough.
 Lap 110: LeeRoy Yarbrough took over the lead from Parnelli Jones.
 Lap 111: Parnelli Jones took over the lead from LeeRoy Yarbrough.
 Lap 137: The rear end of Frank James' vehicle was forcibly removed in an unsafe manner.
 Lap 143: Paul Dority's engine suddenly acted in a strange manner.
 Lap 148: David Pearson's vehicle developed transmission issues that sidelined him.
 Lap 163: Dave Marcis had a terminal crash.
 Lap 164: The bell housing on Bobby Allison's vehicle was acting strangely.
 Lap 168: Parnelli Jones's vehicle suffered from a problematic clutch.
 Lap 169: A.J. Foyt took over the lead from Parnelli Jones.
 Lap 186: Richard Petty's engine stopped working properly.
 Finish: A.J. Foyt was officially declared the winner of the event.

References

Motor Trend 500
Motor Trend 500
NASCAR races at Riverside International Raceway